Janko Neuber (born 25 June 1971) is a German former cross-country skier. He competed at the 1992 Winter Olympics and the 1994 Winter Olympics.

References

External links
 

1971 births
Living people
German male cross-country skiers
Olympic cross-country skiers of Germany
Cross-country skiers at the 1992 Winter Olympics
Cross-country skiers at the 1994 Winter Olympics
People from Erzgebirgskreis
Sportspeople from Saxony
20th-century German people